The Footy Show is an Australian television program which was broadcast on the Seven Network, Melbourne television station HSV-7. It was broadcast on Fridays from 12 April 1957 to 20 September 1957, and again from 4 April 1958 to 19 September 1958.

Broadcast 
The program was presented by Australian footballers Doug Elliot and Jack Dyer, along with fellow VFL football players. It was a 30-minute program.

It is unlikely (though not impossible) that any of the episodes exist as Kinescope recordings.

See also

List of Australian television series

References

External links

Seven Network original programming
1957 Australian television series debuts
1958 Australian television series endings
Australian sports television series
English-language television shows
Black-and-white Australian television shows